François Blank (December 30, 1930 – November 3, 2021) was a Swiss professional ice hockey player who competed for the Switzerland national team at the 1952 Winter Olympics.

References

External links

1930 births
2021 deaths
Ice hockey players at the 1952 Winter Olympics
Olympic ice hockey players of Switzerland
People from Neuchâtel
Swiss ice hockey right wingers
Sportspeople from the canton of Neuchâtel